Saray-e Malek (also Romanized as Sarāy-e Malek; also known as Sarā-ye Malek) is a village in Koreh Soni Rural District, in the Central District of Salmas County, West Azerbaijan Province, Iran. At the 2006 census, its population was 1,005, in 187 families.

References 

Populated places in Salmas County